Yevgeny Ilyich Ukhnalev (born 4 September 1931, in Leningrad, Russia) is a contemporary Russian artist and the honorary Russian state artist.

Early life
Ukhnalev was born in Leningrad in 1931, during the soviet famine of 1932-1933. Dekulakization was pursued during this period, which was meant to highlight the economic disparity present in Russia prior to the political ascent of the Bolsheviks. Thegovernment imposed collectivization of agricultural activity, such as wheat, grain and livestock production, under the theory that kulaks ("rich" peasants) were the main culprits. The consequences of collectivization were drastic- approximately 5.5.-6.5. millions died.

Yevgeny's father was Ilya Akimovich Ykhnalev, an inventor, metal worker and political commentator at the time.

Education and arrest
From 1944–1948 Ukhnalev studied at the secondary I. Repin Art College at the St. Petersburg State Academy Institute of Painting, Sculpture and Architecture. Ukhnalev's radical artistic endeavors, as well as social and political criticism evident on his canvases, ensured that after graduation in 1948, he was arrested and sentenced to 25 years imprisonment, following Article 58 of the Russian SFSR Penal Code. Ukhnalev was sent to a Gulag in Vorkuta.

Career
Ukhnalev was released after six years at the labor camp in 1954. He returned to Leningrad. Ukhnalev was employed as an architect for the design of institutes. From 1967–1975 Ukhnalev worked as chief architect at the State Hermitage Museum.

Ukhanlev's become a member of the President's Advisory Council for cultural and artistic pursuits. In 1997, Ukhnalev was given the title of People's Artist of the Russian Federation. His official inauguration into the Russian Union of Artists signified his ultimate acceptance as an artist and a citizen.

Awards
50 Years of Victory in Great Patriotic War of 1941–1945, Liberal Artist Award (1995)
In Commemoration of the 300th Anniversary of St. Petersburg, Honorary Artist Award (2003)
Anniversary of the Complete Liberation of Leningrad from the Nazi Blockade, Liberal Artist Award (2004)

Solo exhibitions (selected)
Dostoevsky Museum, Leningrad (1988)
Solo exhibitions at galleries and exhibition halls, San Francisco, CA, USA (1993)
Cultural Center of Salzburg, Austria (1995)
Anna Akhmatova Museum, St. Petersburg, Russia (1997)
State Hermitage Museum, St. Petersburg, Russia (2001)
Erarta Museum and Galleries of Contemporary Art, St. Petersburg, Russia (2011)

Museum and public collections (selected)
State Hermitage Museum, St. Petersburg, Russia;
Anna Akhmatova Museum, St. Petersburg, Russia;
Erarta Museum and Galleries of Contemporary Art, St. Petersburg, Russia;
Kemerovo Regional Museum of Fine Arts, Kemerovo, Russia.

Ukhnalev's works can be found in private collections in Russia, Finland, Sweden, Germany and the USA.

External links
Museum Collection
Biography
Ukhnalev as a political dissident

Living people
Russian contemporary artists
1931 births

ru:Ухналёв, Евгений Ильич